Babbar (also spelled as Bubber and Babar, also called as Babrani in Sindh) is a surname found among the Aroras of Punjab and the Jath Baloches originating in Makran. Jath Baloches are camel-men from the Baloch  origin whereas the Aroras are a sub-caste of Khatri community. The Baloch Babbars and the Arora Babbar, both are different from each other in origin. The Babbar (Baloch) is a totemic surname that means "lion". The Babbar Baloch clan is said to be descended from the larger Hoth tribe. They are present as a sub-cast of Jamali tribe in Balochistan. In Punjab, the Baloch Babbars are mostly concentrated in the district of Muzaffargarh, Rahim Yar Khan, Rajanpur and Dera Ghazi Khan, and Arora Babbars mostly live in the Indian states of Punjab, Haryana and Delhi.

Notable people
 Aarya Babbar, Indian actor
 Nadira Babbar, Indian theatre actress
 Prateik Babbar, Indian actor
 Raj Babbar, Indian actor

See also 
 Basti Babbar, village in Bahawalpur, Punjab

References

Indian surnames
Surnames of Indian origin
Surnames of Hindustani origin
Punjabi-language surnames
Hindu surnames
Khatri clans
Khatri surnames
Punjabi tribes